Adi Nalić (born 1 December 1997) is a professional footballer who plays as a midfielder for Hammarby IF in Allsvenskan. Born in Sweden to Bosnian parents, Nalić made his senior international debut for Bosnia and Herzegovina in 2021.

Club career

Early career
Nalić came through Mjällby AIF's youth setup. He made his professional debut in Ettan, Sweden's third tier, against Tvååkers IF on 11 September 2016 at the age of 18.

In January 2017, he joined Landskrona BoIS in Superettan. On 19 February, he scored his first professional goal against Gefle IF, which sent his team through in their cup tie.

Malmö FF
On 16 November 2018, Nalić signed a four-year deal with Malmö FF. In March 2019, he was sent on a season-long loan to fellow Allsvenskan club AFC Eskilstuna.

He made his official debut for Malmö on 15 June 2020. On 12 August, he scored his first goal against Örebro SK, which secured the victory for his team. He won his first trophy with the club on 8 November, when they were crowned league champions.

On 14 September 2021, Nalić debuted in UEFA Champions League against Juventus.

In April 2022, he suffered a severe knee injury, which was diagnosed as anterior cruciate ligament tear and was ruled out for at least six months.

Hammarby IF
On 7 January 2023, Nalić signed a two-year deal, with an option for a further year, with Hammarby IF in Allsvenskan. He moved on a free transfer after his contract with Malmö had expired.

International career
In May 2021, Nalić received his first senior call-up to Bosnia and Herzegovina, for friendly games against Montenegro and Denmark. He debuted against the former on 2 June.

Personal life
Nalić's father Zlatan was also a professional footballer, as well as his grandfather Mesud.

Career statistics

Club

International

Honours
Malmö FF
Allsvenskan: 2020, 2021
Svenska Cupen: 2021–22

References

External links

1997 births
Living people
People from Sölvesborg Municipality
Swedish people of Bosnia and Herzegovina descent
Citizens of Bosnia and Herzegovina through descent
Bosnia and Herzegovina footballers
Bosnia and Herzegovina international footballers
Bosnia and Herzegovina expatriate footballers
Association football midfielders
Mjällby AIF players
Landskrona BoIS players
Malmö FF players
AFC Eskilstuna players
Hammarby Fotboll players
Ettan Fotboll players
Superettan players
Allsvenskan players
Bosnia and Herzegovina expatriate sportspeople in Sweden